Benzyl alcohol O-benzoyltransferase (benzoyl-CoA:benzyl alcohol benzoyltransferase, benzoyl-CoA:benzyl alcohol/phenylethanol benzoyltransferase, benzoyl-coenzyme A:benzyl alcohol benzoyltransferase, benzoyl-coenzyme A:phenylethanol benzoyltransferase) is an enzyme with systematic name benzoyl-CoA:benzyl alcohol O-benzoyltransferase. This enzyme catalyses the following chemical reaction

 benzoyl-CoA + benzyl alcohol  CoA + benzyl benzoate

The enzyme is involved in benzenoid and benzoic acid biosynthesis.

References

External links 
 

EC 2.3.1